Fisher Homestead, also known as Cedarcroft Farm, is a historic home located near Lewes, Sussex County, Delaware. It dates to about 1850, and is a two-story, single-pile, center-hall plan dwelling with wood pilasters at the corners in the Greek Revival style.  It has a gable roof and is sheathed in cedar shingles.  It has an original one-story, three bay rear wing, and a two-story wing raised to that height in the early 1900s.

It was added to the National Register of Historic Places in 1980.

References

Houses on the National Register of Historic Places in Delaware
Houses completed in 1850
Houses in Lewes, Delaware
National Register of Historic Places in Sussex County, Delaware